Tanima Sen is a Bengali film and television actress.

Acting career

Theatre 
Though Sen is mainly popular as a film and television actress, she started as a theatre artist. In 1984, she made her acting debut in a local theatre group. In 1985, she acted in a play named Baluchari, which was staged at the Star Theatre, Kolkata and continued for 500 shows. Besides acting, she has written plays. A play, Swarger Kache, was staged by Bengali theatre group Rangmahal.

In 1994, she started her own theatre group, Shyambazar Apalak.

Television 
In 1995–96, Sen was first cast in a television serial, Jodi Emon Hoto. She has worked in serials like Janmabhumi, Roopkotha, Labonyer Sangsar, Swaragini-Jodein Rishton Ke Sur and Pandemonium.

Filmography

Plays 
 Baluchari (1985)
 Kacher Putul
 Swikarakti
 Ghar- Jamai (1989)
 Swarger Kache (playwright)

Films 
 Gogoler Kirti
 Obhishopto Nighty
 Classmate (2012) (Unreleased) actor
 Pather Sesh Kothay (2012) director, producer, story
 Prem By Chance (2010) actor
 Bondhu Eso Tumi (2010) actor
 Brake Fail (2009) actor
 Premer Phande Kakatua (2009) actor
 Bor Aasbe Ekhuni (2008) actor
 Jinon Rang Berang (2008)
ghawre and bayire
kantho

Television 
 Janmabhumi
 Roopkotha 
 Labonyer Sangsar
 Sasuri Zindabad (Zee Bangla)
 Bibi Chowdhurani as Bibi and Mini's Grandmother.( Zee Bangla)
 Swaragini - Jodein Rishton Ke Sur as Shobha Bose. (Colors)
 Premer Phande as Rishi's Grandmother(Zee Bangla)
 Pandemonium
Kajollata as Shobha ( Colours Bangla)
 Devi Chaudhurani (TV Show) as Brojeswar's Grandmother. (Star Jalsha)
 Soudaminir Songshar as Harisadhan's elder Sister.(Zee Bangla)
 Ranna Banna (Anchor now replaced by (Aparajita Adhay) along with Raktim Mitra) (Star Jalsha)
 Phirki as Sunanda Singha Roy  (Zee Bangla)
Sanjher Baati as Bonolata Dastidaar.( Star Jalsha)

Awards 
 Zee Bangla award for 1) "Dhyattarika" and 2) "Labonnoyer Sansar" (twice) 
 Uttam Kumar Smriti Award (twice) 
 Hemanta Kumar Smriti (memorial) award. 
 Shyamal Mitra Smriti (memorial) award. 
 Shubendu Smriti (memorial) award. 
 Pramathesh Barua Smriti (memorial) award. 
 Vivek Samman award. 
 Dishari Award for her roles in theatre.

See also 
 Paran Bandopadhyay
 Anusuya Majumdar

References

External links 
 

Bengali television actresses
Actresses in Bengali cinema
Living people
Indian film actresses
Indian television actresses
21st-century Indian actresses
Year of birth missing (living people)
Indian stage actresses
20th-century Indian actresses
Film directors from West Bengal